Global Centre for Traditional Medicine was set up by World Health Organisation in Jamnagar,Gujarat,India to promote Traditional Medicines as system of treatment for various ailments. The foundation stone for the centre was laid down by Prime Minister of India Mr. Narendra Modi in the presence of Prime Minister of Mauritius  Pravind Kumar Jugnauth and Director-General of World Health Organisation Tedros Adhanom Ghebreyesus on 20th April 2022. The centre is considered important as traditional medicine is first line of treatment in many countries. To support the establishment of Global Centre for Traditional Medicine, and its related infrastructure and operational expenditure, Government of India has committed $250 million. Government offices of 107 member countries of World Health Organisation will be based in the centre.

History 

The establishment of Global Centre for Traditional Medicine in Jamnagar was announced on 3 November 2020 by World Health Organization (WHO) Director-General Dr Tedros Ghebreyesus. The centre which is first of its kind is planned as global traditional medicine hub. The centre is set up with the Initial Investment of $250 million support from Indian Government to meet its infrastructural and operational costs.

Objective 

Global Centre for Traditional Medicine has been set up with following objectives

1. Use of technology for the creation of traditional knowledge database system.

2. To improve the acceptability of traditional medicines, the centre plans to create testing and certification of these medicines based on International level standards. 

3. Becoming a platform for traditional medicine experts from all over the world to join hands and use their experience in developing the medicines. 

4. The centre should be able to raise funds to be used in research for the development of traditional medicines.. 

5. For any patient to get benefitted from both traditional and modern medicines, the centre should design holistic treatment protocols for specific diseases.

Participating Countries 

Government offices of 107 WHO member countries will have its offices in the centre.

Need 

The following are the main reasons for setting up the centre

 Integration of health facilities, working staff and accredited stllabus in Traditional Medicine.

 As components in pharmaceutical products consists of 40% of natural substances,the need for its sustenance and conservation of it biodiversity.

 Usage of artificial intelligence in evidence mapping and also innovating methods used in traditional medicine.

 In digital arena, applications in mobile phones, online sessions, and other technologies also update information on traditional medicine.

Focus 

Global Centre for Traditional Medicine will focus on establishing qualitative standards on practices and products of traditional medicine through following approaches

 Evidence based learning system.

 Collection and analysis of Data.

 Equity and Sustainability.

 Optimization of traditional medicine for its sustainable development and working for its contribution towards global health through innovational methods.

See Also 

 Traditional Medicine

References

External links 
 www.example.com

Traditional medicine
Research institutes in India
World Health Organization